Bob Bryan and Mike Bryan successfully defended their 2010 title, defeating John Isner and Sam Querrey in the final.

Seeds

Draw

Draw

External links
 Main Draw

References

Doubles